The 2013–14 Armenian First League season began on 21 July 2013 and finished on 15 June 2014.

League table

See also
 2013–14 Armenian Premier League
 2013–14 Armenian Cup

References

 

Armenian First League seasons
2013–14 in Armenian football
Armenia